Agnes Arellano (born 21 November 1949) is a Philippine sculptor known for her surrealistic sculptural groupings.

Career
A family tragedy that occurred in 1981 determined the course of her career and the major themes in her art. Her parents, her sister Citas and a housemaid were killed in a fire that razed the Arellanos’ ancestral home in San Juan, Metro Manila. Arellano received news of the fire while she was on holiday in Spain. In memory of her late parents and sister, she decided to set up the nonprofit Pinaglabanan Galleries on the site of the ancestral home. Many unusual Philippine and foreign artworks were to be exhibited there, and talented artists were also given subsidies.

Arellano commemorated the tragic death of her parents and sister 7 years later with a multimedia event called Fire and Death—A Labyrinth of Ritual Art. She created a unique installation consisting of a labyrinth of thematic shrines in the Arellano garden, combining sculptures, poetry, photographs, sound sculptures, plants, and family memorabilia. This demonstrated the deep sense of the precarious balance between death and life that she had become conscious of after the tragedy. This theme would find its way into many of her other works as well.

References
Kintanar, Thelma B. and Ventura, Sylvia M. Self-Portraits: Twelve Filipina Artists Speak. Quezon City: ADMU Press, 1999.
Guillermo, Alice G. Image to Meaning. Quezon City: ADMU Press, 2001.

Filipino sculptors
1949 births
Living people
Artists from Metro Manila
University of the Philippines Diliman alumni
Ateneo de Manila University alumni
Paris-Sorbonne University alumni